The concerto delle donne (also concerto di donne or concerto delle (or di) dame) was a group of professional female singers in the late Italian Renaissance, primarily in the court of Ferrara, Italy. Renowned for their technical and artistic virtuosity, the ensemble was founded by Alfonso II, Duke of Ferrara, in 1580 and was active until the court was dissolved in 1597. Giacomo Vincenti, a music publisher, praised the women as "virtuose giovani" (young virtuosas), echoing the sentiments of contemporaneous diarists and commentators.

The origins of the ensemble lay in an amateur group of high-placed courtiers who performed for each other within the context of the Duke's informal musica secreta in the 1570s. The ensemble evolved into an all-female group of professional musicians, the concerto delle donne, who performed formal concerts for members of the inner circle of the court and important visitors. Their signature style of florid, highly ornamented singing brought prestige to Ferrara and inspired composers of the time.

The concerto delle donne revolutionized the role of women in professional music, and continued the tradition of the Este court as a musical center. Word of the ladies' ensemble spread across Italy, inspiring imitations in the powerful courts of the Medici and Orsini. The founding of the concerto delle donne was the most important event in secular Italian music in the late sixteenth century; the musical innovations established in the court were important in the development of the madrigal, and eventually the seconda pratica.

History

Formation

At the court in Ferrara, a collection of ladies skilled in music inspired the composer Luzzasco Luzzaschi and caught the interest of Alfonso II d'Este, Duke of Ferrara. This group, which led to the formation of the concerto delle donne, performed within the context of the Duke's musica secreta, a regular series of chamber music concerts performed for a private audience. This preliminary group was originally made up of talented but amateur members of the court: the sisters Lucrezia and Isabella Bendidio, as well as Leonora Sanvitale, and Vittoria Bentivoglio. They were joined by bass Giulio Cesare Brancaccio, who was brought to the court in 1577 for his singing abilities. The preliminary ensemble was active throughout the 1570s, and its membership solidified in 1577. Only later did professionals replace these original singers.

The Duke did not announce the creation of a professional, all-female ensemble; instead, the group infiltrated and gradually dominated the musica secreta, so that after the dismissal of Brancaccio for insubordination in 1583, no more male members of the musica secreta were hired. Even when Brancaccio was performing with the consort it was referred to as a ladies' ensemble, because women singing together was the most exciting aspect of the group. This new ensemble, the concerto delle donne, was created by the Duke in part to amuse his young new wife, Margherita Gonzaga d'Este (she was only fourteen when they wed in 1579), and in part to help the Duke achieve his artistic goals for the court. According to Grana, a contemporary correspondent, "Signora Machiavella [Lucrezia], Signora Isabella, and Signora Vittoria have abandoned the field, having lost the backing of Luzzaschi". The first recorded performance by the professional ladies was on November 20, 1580; by the 1581 carnival season, they were performing together regularly.

This new "consort of ladies" was viewed as an extraordinary and novel phenomenon; most witnesses did not connect the second period of the concerto delle donne with the group of ladies who sang in the musica secreta. However, modern musicologists now view the earlier group as a crucial part of the creation and development of the social and vocal genre of the concerto delle donne.

Roster and duties
The most prominent member of the new ensemble was Laura Peverara, followed by Livia d'Arco and Anna Guarini, daughter of the prolific poet Giovanni Battista Guarini. Giovanni wrote poems for many of the madrigals which were set for the ensemble, and choreographed scenes for the balletto delle donne. Judith Tick believes Tarquinia Molza sang with the group, but Anthony Newcomb says she was involved solely as an advisor and instructor. Whether Tarquinia Molza ever performed with them or not, she was ousted from any role in the group after her affair with the composer Giaches de Wert came to light in 1589. Luzzasco Luzzaschi directed and composed music to showcase the ensemble, and accompanied them on the harpsichord. Ippolito Fiorini was the maestro di capella, in charge of the entire court's musical activities. In addition to his duties to the overall court, he accompanied the concerto on the lute. Vittorio Baldini was brought to the court as ducal music printer in 1582.

The singers of the second era of the concerto delle donne were officially ladies-in-waiting of Duchess Margherita Gonzaga d'Este, but were hired primarily as singers. Peverara's musical abilities prompted the Duke to specifically ask his wife Margherita to bring Peverara from Mantua as part of her retinue. The new singers played instruments, including the lute, harp, and viol, but focused their energies on developing vocal virtuosity. This skill became highly prized in the mid-sixteenth century, beginning with basses like Brancaccio, but by the end of the century virtuosic bass singing went out of style, and higher voices came into vogue. The ladies' musical duties included performing with the duchess' balletto delle donne, a group of female dancers who frequently crossdressed. Despite their upper-class background, the singers would not have been welcomed into the court's inner circle had they not been such skilled performers. D'Arco belonged to the nobility, but a minor family only. Peverara was the daughter of a wealthy merchant, and Molza came from a prominent family of artists.

The women performed up to six hours a day, either singing their own florid repertoire from memory, sight-reading from partbooks, or participating in the balletti as singers and dancers. Thomasin LaMay posits that the women of the concerti delle donne provided sexual favors for members of the court, but there is no evidence for this, and the circumstances of their marriages and dowries argues against this interpretation. The women were paid salaries and received other benefits, such as dowries and apartments in the ducal palace. Peverara received 300 scudi a year and lodging in the ducal palace for herself, her husband, and her mother – as well as a dowry of 10,000 scudi upon her marriage.

Despite having married three times in the hopes of producing an heir, Alfonso II died in 1597 without issue, legitimate or otherwise. His cousin Cesare inherited the Duchy, but the city of Ferrara, which was legally a Papal fief, was annexed to the Papal States in 1598 through a combination of "firm diplomacy and unscrupulous pressure" by Pope Clement VIII. The Este court had to abandon Ferrara in disarray and the concerto delle donne was disbanded.

Music

The greatest musical innovation of the concerto delle donne was the multiplication of the ornamented upper voices, from one voice singing diminutions above an instrumental accompaniment to two or three voices singing varying diminutions at once. This practice, which listeners found remarkable, was imitated by many composers, including Carlo Gesualdo, Luca Marenzio and Claudio Monteverdi.

These composers wrote music either inspired by the concerto delle donne or specifically for them. Such works are characterized by a high tessitura, a virtuosic and florid style, and a wide range. Lodovico Agostini's third book of madrigals was perhaps the first publication fully dedicated to the new singing style. Agostini dedicated songs to Guarini, Peverara, and Luzzaschi. Gesualdo wrote music for the group in 1594 while visiting Ferrara to marry the Duke's niece Leonora d'Este. De Wert's Seventh Book of Madrigals à 5 and Marenzio's First Book à 6 were the first true musical monuments to the new concerto delle donne. Monteverdi's Canzonette a tre voci was probably influenced by the "Ladies of Ferrara". Although the only works clearly intended for or inspired by the concerto delle donne were works for multiple high voices executing written-out diminutions, in practice concerts with the concerto delle donne included the older style of solo ornamented madrigals with instrumental accompaniment. Peverara was singularly lauded for her skill in this genre. Works written for the concerto delle donne were not limited to music: Torquato Tasso and G.B. Guarini wrote poems dedicated to the ladies in the concerto, some of which were later set by composers. Tasso wrote over seventy-five poems to Peverara alone.

Luzzaschi's book of madrigals for one, two, and three sopranos with keyboard accompaniment, published in 1601, comprises works written throughout the 1580s. This music may have been kept back from publication in order to maintain the secrecy of Alfonso's musica secreta, and to maintain control over it. Newcomb considers this publication the exemplar of the ladies' signature musical style. In 1584, Alessandro Striggio, responding to requests from Francesco I de' Medici, Grand Duke of Tuscany, described the ladies and composed pieces imitating their style so that Francesco could start his own concerto delle donne. Striggio mentioned an ornamented four voice madrigal for three sopranos and a dialogue with imitative diminutions for two sopranos. He added that he had forgotten the intabulation for the madrigal in Mantua, and noted that the skilled singer Giulio Caccini could play the bass part on either lute or harpsichord. This indicates both that male singers were probably not used after Brancaccio, and that instrumental accompaniments were a common and acceptable means of filling in the counterpoint.

The output of the ducal printer, Baldini, consisted largely of music written for the concerto delle donne, including the works of the foremost madrigalists: Luzzaschi, Gesualdo, and Alfonso Fontanelli. His first publication for the Duke was Il lauro secco (1582), which was followed by Il lauro verde (1583), both containing music by the leading composers of Rome and Northern Italy. Music in honor of the concerto was printed as far away as Venice, with Paolo Virchi's First Book à 5, published by Giacomo Vincenti and Ricciardo Amadino containing the madrigal which begins SeGU'ARINAscer LAURA e prenda LARCO / Amor soave e dolce / Ch'ogni cor duro MOLCE. This capitalization is in the original, clearly spelling out the equivalent of the names Anna Guarini, Laura Peverara, Livia d'Arco, and Tarquinia Molza.

With the obvious exception of Brancaccio, all the singers in the concerto were female sopranos. Although the music written for the concerto focused on high voices, there is no evidence that the ensemble used either castrati or falsettists. This fact is surprising, considering that castrati were shortly to become the biggest stars of a new art form, opera. In 1607, Monteverdi's Orfeo featured four castrato roles out of a cast of nine, showing the new dominance of this vocal type. It also contrasts with Margherita's father's court, where Guglielmo Gonzaga actively sought out eunuchs.

Polyphonic arrangements called for the women to sing diminutions (melodic divisions of longer notes) and other ornaments in consort. Diminutions were traditionally improvised in performance. However, to coordinate their voices, they transcribed and rehearsed the music in advance, transforming these improvisations into highly developed musical forms that composers would emulate. The singers may have used the more traditional practice in their solo repertoire, performing ornaments extemporaneously. Specific ornaments used by the concerto delle donne, mentioned in a source from 1581, were such popular sixteenth-century devices as passaggi (division of a long note into many shorter notes, usually stepwise), cadenze (decoration of the penultimate note, sometimes quite elaborate), and tirate (rapid scales). Accenti (connection of two longer notes, using dotted rhythms), a staple of early Baroque music, are absent from the list. In 1592 Caccini claimed that Alfonso II asked him to teach his ladies the new accenti and passaggi styles.

Styles

There are two separate styles of madrigals written for and inspired by the concerto delle donne. The first is the "luxuriant" style of the 1580s. The second is music in the style of the seconda pratica, written in the 1590s. Luzzaschi wrote music in both of these styles. The style of the earlier period, as exemplified in the works of Luzzaschi, involves the use of madrigal texts written by poets within the Ferrarese sphere, such as Tasso and G.B. Guarini. These poems tend to be short and witty with single sections. Musically, Luzzaschi's works are highly sectionalized and based on melodic themes, rather than harmonic structures. Luzzaschi lessens the sectionalizing effect of his compositional techniques by weakening cadences. His tendency to reiterate melodies in different voices, including the bass voice, leads to tonal creations which are sometimes bewildering. These aspects make Luzzaschi's music much more polyphonic than Monteverdi's later compositions, and thus more conservative; however, Luzzaschi's use of jarring melodic leaps and harmonic dissonance are individualistic. These dissonances, which contrast sharply with the careful treatment of dissonance during most of the 16th century, is closely connected with the ornamented polyphonic madrigals of the concerto delle donne. In Giovanni Artusi's socratic dialogue, the character defending Monteverdi connects haphazard treatment of dissonance with ornamental singing.

Performance
The concerto delle donne transformed the musica secreta. In the past, members of the audience would perform, and performers would become audience members. During the ascendancy of the concerto delle donne the roles within the musica secreta became fixed, as did the roster of those who performed for the Duke's pleasure every night.

The elite, hand-selected audience members favored with admission to performances by the concerto delle donne demanded diversions and entertainment beyond the pleasures of beautiful music alone. During the concerts, members of the concerto'''s audience would sometimes play cards. Orazio Urbani, ambassador of the Grand Duke of Tuscany, having waited several years to see the concerto, complained that he was forced not only to play cards, distracting him from the performance, but also simultaneously admire and praise the women's music to their patron Alfonso. After at least one concert, to continue the entertainment, a dwarf couple danced. Alfonso was not as interested in these peripheral entertainments, and in one instance excused himself from the party to go sit under a tree to listen to the ladies, and follow along with the madrigal texts and musical scores, including embellishments, which were made available to listeners.

Influence
The concerto delle donne was a revolutionary musical establishment that helped effect a shift in women's role in music; its success took women from obscurity to "the apex of the profession". Women were openly brought to court to train as professional musicians, and by 1600, a woman could have a viable career as a musician, independent of her husband or father. New women's ensembles inspired by the concerto delle donne resulted in more positions for women as professional singers and more music for them to perform.

Despite the dissolution of the court in 1597, the musical style which was inspired by the concerto delle donne spread throughout Europe, and remained prominent for almost fifty years. The concerto delle donne was so influential and often imitated that it became a cliché of northern Italian courts. It heavily influenced the development of the madrigal and eventually the seconda practica. The group' brought Alfonso and his court international prestige, as the ladies' reputation spread throughout Italy and southern Germany. It functioned as a powerful tool of propaganda, projecting an image of strength and affluence.

Having seen the concerto delle donne in Ferrara, Caccini created a rival group made up of his family and a pupil. This ensemble was sponsored by the Medici, and traveled as far abroad as Paris to perform for Marie de' Medici. Francesca Caccini had much success composing and singing in the style of the concerto delle donne. Beginning in 1585, rival groups were created in Florence by the Medici, Rome by the Orsini, and Mantua by the Gonzaga. There was even a rival group in Ferrara based in the Castello Estense, the very palace where the concerto delle donne'' performed. This group was formed by Alfonso's sister Lucrezia d'Este, Duchess of Urbino. She had lived at the Este court since 1576, and shortly after Margherita's marriage to Alfonso in 1579, Alfonso and his henchmen killed Lucrezia's lover. Lucrezia was unhappy about being replaced as the matron of the house by Margherita, and upset by the murder of her lover, leading to her desire to be separate from the rest of her family during her evening entertainments.

Barbara Strozzi was among the last composers and performers in this style, which by the mid-seventeenth century was considered archaic.

Notes

Citations

References

 
 
 
 
 
 
 
 
 

Grove sources

  
  
  
  
  
  
  
  
  

Baroque music
Renaissance music
Italian classical music groups
Women in classical music
1580 establishments in Italy
1597 disestablishments in Europe
History of Ferrara
Musical groups established in the 16th century